Yang Talat is a district (amphoe) in the western part of Kalasin province, northeastern Thailand.

Geography
Neighboring districts are (from the northwest clockwise): Huai Mek, Nong Kung Si, Mueang Kalasin, and Khong Chai of Kalasin Province; Kantharawichai and Chiang Yuen of Maha Sarakham province.

History
Originally named Pachim Kalasin (ปจิมกาฬสินธุ์), the district was renamed Phu Len Chang (ภูแล่นช้าง) in 1913. In 1917, it received its current name Yang Talat.

Administration
The district is divided into 15 sub-districts (tambons), which are further subdivided into 207 villages (mubans). There are six sub-district municipalities (thesaban tambons): Yang Talat covers parts of tambon Yang Talat and Dok Si covers parts of tambons Dok Sombun and Um Mao. Bua Ban, Itue, Hua Na Kham, and Khao Phra Non are further sub-district municipalities which cover the whole same-named sub-district. There are a further 11 tambon administrative organizations (TAO).

References

External links
amphoe.com (Thai)

Yang Talat